Lieutenant-General James Kriel  (8 March 1942 – 18 July 2016) was a South African military commander.  He joined the South African Air Force in 1959.

Kriel attended Tygerberg High School before doing a pilot course in 1959. He served as OC 35 Squadron SAAF at AFB Ysterplaat from 1974 to 1977, flying the Avro Shackleton. He later served as Officer Commanding AFB Ysterplaat as a colonel before being transferred to Headquarters in the role of director air planning as a brigadier.

Kriel was promoted to Chief of Air Staff Operations as a major general in 1986, followed by Chief of Air Force staff till 1991, when he was promoted to lieutenant general and appointed Chief of the Air Force.

Kriel died on 18 July 2016 at the age of 74. He married  Nellie Toerien on 4 August 1963. She was the daughter of Mattheus and Catharina (Née Bosman)

Honours and awards
He was awarded the Order of the Star of South Africa (Silver) in 1994.

See also
 List of South African military chiefs
 South African Air Force

References

1942 births
2016 deaths
Afrikaner people
People from Cape Town
Chiefs of the South African Air Force
South African military personnel of the Border War
South African people of German descent